The 2000 Mayhem was the second and final Mayhem professional wrestling pay-per-view (PPV) event produced by World Championship Wrestling (WCW). The event took place on November 26, 2000 from the U.S. Cellular Arena in Milwaukee, Wisconsin.

Storylines
The event featured wrestlers from pre-existing scripted feuds and storylines. Wrestlers portrayed villains, heroes, or less distinguishable characters in the scripted events that built tension and culminated in a wrestling match or series of matches.

Event

Twelve matches were contested at the event. The main event was a straitjacket steel cage match between Booker T and Scott Steiner for the WCW World Heavyweight Championship. Steiner won the title by knocking Booker out with a Steiner Recliner after hitting him with a steel chair. Other prominent match on the card was Goldberg versus Lex Luger, with the stipulation that Goldberg would be forced to leave WCW if he lost. The event featured many title matches including a WCW World Tag Team Championship match, in which Perfect Event defended the titles against The Insiders in a rivalry stemming from the New Blood versus Millionaire's Club angle from earlier in the year.

Reception
In 2015, Kevin Pantoja of 411Mania gave the event a rating of 2.5 [Very Bad], stating, "I’ve seen worse from WCW around this time but not by much. Nothing on the entire card cracked three stars, with the three way tag match and WCW World Title being the best. The Tag Titles aren’t bad, but they aren’t really good either. Too many people just seemed to not care and it hurt the quality of most of the matches. You can kind of tell that this was a company ready to close their doors soon."

Results

References

External links
Mayhem 2000

WCW Mayhem
Events in Milwaukee
2000 in Wisconsin
Professional wrestling in Milwaukee
November 2000 events in the United States
2000 World Championship Wrestling pay-per-view events